The Aduana Building (Aduana de Manila or Manila Customs House), also known as the Intendencia, was a Spanish colonial structure in Manila, Philippines that housed several government offices through the years.  It is located in front of the BPI Intramuros (formerly the site of the old Santo Domingo Church) at Plaza España, Soriano (Aduana) Ave. corner Muralla St. in Intramuros.

Architecture 
This two-storey governmental structure follows a Neo-Classical tradition, with an emphasized horizontality and symmetrical form, particularly on the design of its façade. The central bay had three arched entrances and two principal staircases built around the two atriums. The rectangular fenestration on the upper most story were decorated with rustication. The window-like portals opening out to small balconies were framed with pilasters topped with ornate capitals and were adorned with elaborate geometrical grillework. Similar ornate grillework also decorated the main entryways in the building.

History 
The Aduana, or Custom House, was built in Intramuros to attract merchants to remain within its walls rather than outside of it. Records show that in 1822, a Spanish engineer Tomás Cortes took charge of the project and began its construction in 1823. Despite objections due to insufficient space for warehousing and its distance from the port, the construction continued until its completion in 1829. However, in 1863, the Aduana suffered damage from an earthquake, which led to its demolition in 1872. Reconstruction of the building was later awarded to Luis Perez Yap-Sionjue, which began in 1874 and was completed in 1876. The rebuilding of the structure was still based from the original design of Cortes but it has now housed the Custom Offices, the Civil Administration Office (Intendencia General de Hacienda), the Treasury, and the Mint House (Casa de Moneda). When the Customs transferred, the offices of the Mint House and Treasury remained in the building and was renamed as Intendencia.

In World War II, the building once again suffered damage; first from Japanese bombings in 1941 and later on from American and Filipino artillery during the Battle of Manila in 1945. The Aduana was repaired after the war and served as the offices of the Central Bank of the Philippines, the National Treasury and eventually the Commission on Elections. The building was abandoned in 1979 after it was ravaged by fire.

In 1997, the National Archives acquired the building to serve as their future office. Restoration efforts were under discussion since 2015, and reconstruction commenced in 2021. According to Google Street View imagery dated May 2022, some of the façades have been reconstructed with new stonework and paint.

See also 

 Iloilo Customs House

References

External links

Buildings and structures in Intramuros
Government buildings in the Philippines
Cultural Properties of the Philippines in Metro Manila
National Historical Landmarks of the Philippines